"No Time" is a song by British YouTuber and rapper KSI from his second studio album, All Over the Place (2021). The song features a guest appearance from American rapper Lil Durk. The song was written by the two rappers alongside its producers S-X, Diego Ave, Chambers and Mally Mall. The song was released for digital download and streaming by RBC Records and BMG on 16 July 2021 upon the release of the album. "No Time" is a hip hop and trap song.

The song debuted at number 24 on the UK Singles Chart and it additionally entered the music charts of Ireland, New Zealand and Sweden. The animated music video was released on 22 October 2021.

Commercial performance 
In the United Kingdom, "No Time" debuted at number 24 on the UK Singles Chart, making it the second highest-placed new entry of that week. The song also debuted at number 7 on the UK Hip Hop and R&B Singles Chart. In the Republic of Ireland, "No Time" debuted at number 30 on the Irish Singles Chart, making it the second highest-placed new entry of that week.

Music video 
The music video for "No Time" was directed and animated by KDC Visions, who has previously created music videos for Juice Wrld, Trippie Redd and XXXTentacion. It was released to KSI's YouTube channel on 22 October 2021.

Credits and personnel 
Credits adapted from Tidal.

 KSIsongwriting, vocals
 Lil Durksongwriting, vocals
 S-Xproduction, songwriting
 Diego Aveproduction, songwriting
 Chambersproduction, songwriting
 Mally Mallproduction, songwriting
 Adam Lunnengineering
 Joe LaPortaengineering
 Kevin Graingerengineering
 Matt Schwartzengineering
 Niko Marzoucaengineering
 Rob MacFarlaneengineering
 Robert Marksengineering

Charts

Release history

References 

2021 songs
2021 singles
KSI songs
Lil Durk songs
Songs written by KSI
Songs written by Lil Durk
Songs written by S-X
Songs written by Mally Mall
Song recordings produced by S-X
RBC Records singles
BMG Rights Management singles